Soul Sold Separately (stylized as $oul $old $eparately) is the fifth studio album by rapper Freddie Gibbs. It was released through Warner Records on September 30, 2022, making it his first to be released on a major label.

Background and concept
Soul Sold Separately is a concept album themed around the $$$ ("Triple-S") Resort and Casino, a fictional Las Vegas hotel where, according to the album's narrative, Gibbs is working in seclusion to complete the record. Gibbs has stated that the "gambling theme" of the album was chosen as a reference to the risks he needed to take to pursue his music career.

The album's title originates from "Education", a track from the 2019 project Bandana. Gibbs describes the title's meaning as follows:

Critical reception

At Metacritic, which assigns a weighted average score out of 100 to reviews from mainstream critics, Soul Sold Separately received an average score of 78 based on 8 reviews, indicating "generally favorable reviews".

Critics generally described the album's prevailing moods as a juxtaposition of lavish aesthetics and dark, vulnerable lyrical content. Thomas Hobbs of Telegraph.co.uk characterizes the album's moods as a balance "between feeling like you're king of the world, unwinding in a presidential suites, and being... paranoid of jealous enemies". Paul Simpson of AllMusic notes that, despite "tales of luxurious excess", the album's lyrics predominantly "focus on the bleakest aspects of the struggle". The introspective aspects of the album have been generally praised, with Gibbs described as displaying "unflinching honesty" and "sincerity [that] can be bracing". Matthew Ritchie of Pitchfork observes that "when [Gibbs] homes in on his own words and self-critiques, he's razor sharp", although in a more critical review, Paul Attard of Slant comments that Gibbs mostly discusses his controversies "in ways that allow him to avoid explaining himself fully". Gibbs' technical skill on the album received widespread critical praise: in various reviews, he has been characterized as a "technically... flawless emcee", as utilizing "incredible rap pyrotechnics", and as "the eternal technician" with a "craftsman-like approach".

The production on Soul Sold Separately has been noted for its variety, featuring a diverse lineup of producers who bring sounds inspired by various East Coast, Midwestern, and Southern regional scenes. Within this diversity, however, several commonalities were noted. Dash Lewis of HipHopDX describes a "pretty cohesive" usage of features like "spacey synths and lush soul samples that snake around tightly coiled drums", and Paul Attard of Slant characterizes the production as "uniformly lavish". This luxurious feel has received mixed reviews; the HipHopDX review states that "at times [...] the glossiness makes the album buckle under its own pressure", while Matthew Ramirez of NPR states that the project "sometimes labors under the weight of a forced progression". The Slant review was particularly critical of the opulence, describing the album as having "a decidedly perfunctory whiff of excessive grandeur". A more positive appraisal of the production came from Paul Simpson of AllMusic, who described the album as "grander in scope than Gibbs' rightly praised single-producer efforts" while still being "nearly as consistent".

The skits which take place between some songs were less positively reviewed. HipHopDX described the skits as the "most jarring" part of the album, and Pitchfork characterized them as "nonsense" that the listener must "make an effort to sort through".

Track listing

Notes
  signifies a co-producer
  signifies an additional producer

Personnel
Musicians
 Freddie Gibbs – vocals
 Harmony Samuels – instruments
 Edgar JV Etienne – instruments
 Rania Nasreen White – additional vocals (tracks 2, 7, 9, 12, 13, 15)
 Swaggyono – programming (16)
 Hit-Boy – programming (17)
 Andre Robinson – programming (20)
 Arianna Reid – programming (20)
 Rodney Montreal – programming (20)

Technical
 Kevin "No Credit" Spencer – mastering (1–16, 18–20), mixing (1–7, 9–16, 18–20)
 Mike Bozzi – mastering (17)
 Ari Morris – mixing (5)
 Jhair "JHA" Lazo – mixing, engineering (8)
 David Kim – mixing (17)
 Thurston "Thurst McGurst" McCrea – mixing (20), engineering (1–15, 18, 20)
 Matthew Herring – engineering (1–15)
 Daniel Escobar – engineering (3)
 Lauren D'Elia – engineering (4)
 Bobby Mota – engineering (11)
 Freddie Gibbs – executive production
 Ben "Lambo" Lambert – executive production
 Norva Denton – executive production

Visuals
 Matthew Draeger – art direction
 Ben "Lambo" Lambert – creative direction
 Nick Walker – photography

References

2022 albums
Freddie Gibbs albums
Warner Records albums
albums produced by Jake One
Hip hop albums by American artists